Wartberg ob der Aist is a municipality in the district of Freistadt in the Austrian state of Upper Austria.

Population

Personalities
Wartberg is the birthplace of Austrian Roman Catholic church official Gerhard Maria Wagner.

References

Cities and towns in Freistadt District